5-Formamidoimidazole-4-carboxamide ribotide (or FAICAR) is an intermediate in the formation of purines.
It is formed by the enzyme AICAR transformylase from AICAR and 10-formyltetrahydrofolate.

References

Imidazoles
Nucleotides